Calwa (formerly, Calwa City) is an unincorporated census-designated place in Fresno County, California, United States. The population was 2,052 at the 2010 census, up from 762 in 2000. The name was taken from the acronym for "California Wine Association" (CalWA).

Geography
Calwa is an almost complete county island surrounded by the city of Fresno on all sides except the southeast corner.

History
In 1885, the land of what is now Calwa, was improved and cultivated by Hugh William La Rue to plant an orchard and vineyard. His first crop was ruined by a grasshopper pest in 1886 and he sought to plant elsewhere.  Calwa became a railroad town when Santa Fe Railways invested one million dollars to build a switching yard and houses for railway employees.  Southern Pacific Railroad also passed through Calwa.  The Calwa City post office opened in 1913, and changed its name to Calwa in 1949.

Demographics

2010
The 2010 United States Census reported that Calwa had a population of 2,052. The racial makeup of Calwa was 995 (48.5%) White, 24 (1.2%) African American, 67 (3.3%) Native American, 43 (2.1%) Asian, 9 (0.4%) Pacific Islander, 846 (41.2%) from other races, and 68 (3.3%) from two or more races. Hispanic or Latino of any race were 1,848 persons (90.1%).

The Census reported that 2,052 people (100% of the population) lived in households, 0 (0%) lived in non-institutionalized group quarters, and 0 (0%) were institutionalized.

There were 480 households, out of which 298 (62.1%) had children under the age of 18 living in them, 221 (46.0%) were opposite-sex married couples living together, 108 (22.5%) had a female householder with no husband present, 83 (17.3%) had a male householder with no wife present.  There were 74 (15.4%) unmarried opposite-sex partnerships, and 1 (0.2%) same-sex married couples or partnerships. 41 households (8.5%) were made up of individuals, and 8 (1.7%) had someone living alone who was 65 years of age or older. The average household size was 4.28.  There were 412 families (85.8% of all households); the average family size was 4.33.

The population was spread out, with 735 people (35.8%) under the age of 18, 268 people (13.1%) aged 18 to 24, 567 people (27.6%) aged 25 to 44, 359 people (17.5%) aged 45 to 64, and 123 people (6.0%) who were 65 years of age or older.  The median age was 25.6 years. For every 100 females, there were 114.4 males.  For every 100 females age 18 and over, there were 120.6 males.

The homeowner vacancy rate was 2.0%; the rental vacancy rate was 7.8%.  817 people (39.8% of the population) lived in owner-occupied housing units and 1,235 people (60.2%) lived in rental housing units.

2000
As of the census of 2000, there were 762 people, 208 households, and 177 families residing in Calwa. The racial makeup of the community was 25.46% White, 0.92% Black or African American, 2.62% Native American, 0.52% Asian, 65.88% from other races, and 4.59% from two or more races.  94.62% of the population were Hispanic or Latino of any race.

There were 208 households, out of which 44.7% had children under the age of 18 living with them, 56.7% were married couples living together, 22.1% had a female householder with no husband present, and 14.9% were non-families. 9.1% of all households were made up of individuals, and 4.3% had someone living alone who was 65 years of age or older.  The average household size was 3.66 and the average family size was 3.90.

The population was spread out, with 30.8% under the age of 18, 12.2% from 18 to 24, 26.5% from 25 to 44, 17.7% from 45 to 64, and 12.7% who were 65 years of age or older.  The median age was 30 years. For every 100 females, there were 95.4 males.  For every 100 females age 18 and over, there were 95.9 males.

The median income for a household in the community was $28,983, and the median income for a family was $28,285. Males had a median income of $32,167 versus $19,583 for females. The per capita income for the community was $8,292.  About 27.9% of families and 28.0% of the population were below the poverty line, including 36.9% of those under age 18 and 14.6% of those age 65 or over.

Transportation
Calwa is served by Fresno Area Express buses.

References

Census-designated places in Fresno County, California
Populated places established in 1913
Census-designated places in California
1913 establishments in California